The Roberts Court is the time since 2005 during which the Supreme Court of the United States has been led by John Roberts as Chief Justice. It is generally considered to be more conservative than the preceding Rehnquist Court and the most conservative court since the Vinson Court of the 1940s and early 1950s. This is due to the retirement of relatively moderate conservative Justices Sandra Day O'Connor and Anthony Kennedy, the death of liberal Justice Ruth Bader Ginsburg, and the confirmation of conservative Justices Samuel Alito, Brett Kavanaugh, and Amy Coney Barrett in their places, respectively. Since Barrett's confirmation, the Court has six conservative justices and three liberal justices.

Membership
Roberts was originally nominated by President George W. Bush as an associate justice to succeed Sandra Day O'Connor, who had announced her retirement, effective with the confirmation of her successor. However, before the Senate could act upon the nomination, Chief Justice William Rehnquist died. President Bush quickly withdrew the initial nomination and resubmitted it as a nomination for Chief Justice; this second Roberts nomination was confirmed by the Senate on September 29, 2005, by a 78–22 vote. Roberts took the constitutional oath of office, administered by senior Associate Justice John Paul Stevens (who was the acting chief justice during the vacancy) at the White House on the same day as his confirmation. On October 3, Roberts took the judicial oath provided for by the Judiciary Act of 1789, prior to the first oral arguments of the 2005 term. The Roberts Court commenced with Roberts as Chief Justice and the final eight associate justices from the Rehnquist Court: Stevens, O'Connor, Antonin Scalia, Anthony Kennedy, David Souter, Clarence Thomas, Ruth Bader Ginsburg, and Stephen Breyer.

President Bush's second nominee to replace O'Connor, Harriet Miers, withdrew before a vote; Bush's third nominee to replace O'Connor was Samuel Alito, who was confirmed in January 2006. In 2009, President Barack Obama nominated Sonia Sotomayor to replace Souter; she was confirmed. In 2010, Obama nominated Elena Kagan to replace Stevens; she, too, was confirmed. In February 2016, Justice Scalia died; in the following month, Obama nominated Merrick Garland, but Garland's nomination was never considered by the Senate, and it expired when the 114th Congress ended and the 115th Congress began on January 3, 2017. On January 31, 2017, President Donald Trump nominated Neil Gorsuch to replace Scalia. Democrats in the Senate filibustered the Gorsuch nomination, which led to the Republicans exercising the "nuclear option". After that, Gorsuch was confirmed in April 2017. In 2018, Trump nominated Brett Kavanaugh to replace Kennedy; he was confirmed. In September 2020, Justice Ginsburg died; Trump nominated Amy Coney Barrett to succeed Ginsburg and she was confirmed on October 26, 2020, days before the 2020 election. In 2022, Breyer announced his retirement effective at the end of the Supreme Court term, assuming his successor was confirmed, in a letter to President Joe Biden. Biden nominated Ketanji Brown Jackson to succeed Breyer, and she was confirmed by the Senate. Breyer remained on the Supreme Court until it went into its summer recess on June 30, at which point Jackson was sworn in, becoming the first black woman and the first former federal public defender to serve on the Supreme Court.

Timeline

Other branches
Presidents during this court have included George W. Bush, Barack Obama, Donald Trump, and Joe Biden. Congresses included the 109th through the current 118th United States Congresses.

Rulings of the Court

The Roberts court has issued major rulings on incorporation of the Bill of Rights, gun control, affirmative action, campaign finance regulation, abortion, capital punishment, gay rights, unlawful search and seizure, and criminal sentencing. Major decisions of the Roberts Court include:

Massachusetts v. EPA (2007): In a 5–4 decision in which the majority opinion was delivered by Justice Stevens, the Supreme Court upheld the Environmental Protection Agency's right to regulate carbon dioxide under the Clean Air Act.
Medellín v. Texas (2008): In a 5–4 decision in which the majority opinion was delivered by Chief Justice Roberts, the Supreme Court held that even when a treaty constitutes an international commitment, it is not binding domestic law unless either the United States Congress has enacted statutes implementing it or the treaty is explicitly "self-executing".
District of Columbia v. Heller (2008): In a 5–4 decision in which the majority opinion was delivered by Justice Scalia, the Supreme Court held that the Second Amendment applies to federal enclaves, and that the amendment protects the right of individuals to possess a firearm, regardless of service in a militia. McDonald v. City of Chicago (2010), in a 5–4 decision written by Justice Alito, extended this protection to the states.
Kennedy v. Louisiana (2008): In a 5–4 decision written by Justice Kennedy, the court ruled that the Eighth Amendment prohibits capital punishment for crimes that do not involve homicide or treason.
Ashcroft v. Iqbal (2009): In a 5–4 decision written by Justice Kennedy, the court reversed the Second Circuit's decision not to dismiss a suit against former Attorney General John Ashcroft and others that claimed that the FBI engaged in discriminatory activities following the 9/11 attacks. The court also extended the heightened pleading standard established in Bell Atlantic Corp. v. Twombly (2006), which had previously applied only to antitrust law. The number of dismissals greatly increased after the Iqbal ruling.
Citizens United v. Federal Election Commission (2010): In a 5–4 decision in which the majority opinion was delivered by Justice Kennedy, the Court held that the provisions of the Bipartisan Campaign Reform Act which regulated independent expenditures in political campaigns by corporations, unions, and non-profits violated First Amendment freedom of speech rights.
National Federation of Independent Business v. Sebelius (2012): In a 5–4 decision written by Chief Justice Roberts, the Court upheld most of the provisions of the Patient Protection and Affordable Care Act, including the individual mandate to buy health insurance. The mandate was upheld as part of Congress's power of taxation. In a subsequent case, King v. Burwell (2015), the Court upheld the Patient Protection and Affordable Care Act, this time in a 6–3 opinion written by Chief Justice Roberts. In a third related case, California v. Texas (2021), the Court held that neither states nor individuals had the standing to challenge the PPACA's individual mandate due to the penalty being reduced to $0 in the Tax Cuts and Jobs Act of 2017. The 7–2 ruling was written by Justice Breyer.
Arizona v. United States (2012): In a 5–3 decision delivered by Justice Kennedy, the Court held that portions of Arizona SB 1070, an Arizona law regarding immigration, unconstitutionally usurped the federal authority to regulate immigration laws and enforcement.
Shelby County v. Holder (2013): In a 5–4 decision delivered by Chief Justice Roberts, the Court struck down Section 4(b) of the Voting Rights Act of 1965, which provided a coverage formula for Section 5 of the Voting Rights Act. The latter section requires certain states and jurisdictions to obtain federal preclearance before changing voting laws or practices, in an effort to prevent those states and jurisdictions from discriminating against voters. Without a coverage formula, Section 5 of the Voting Rights Act is no longer in effect.
Burwell v. Hobby Lobby (2014): In a 5–4 decision delivered by Justice Alito, the Court exempted closely held corporations from the Affordable Care Act's contraception mandate on the basis of the Religious Freedom Restoration Act.
Riley v. California (2014): In a 9–0 decision, the Court held that the warrantless search and seizure of digital contents of a cell phone during an arrest is unconstitutional.
Obergefell v. Hodges (2015): In a 5–4 decision delivered by Justice Kennedy, the Court held that the Due Process Clause and the Equal Protection Clause both guarantee the right of same-sex couples to marry.
Whole Woman's Health v. Hellerstedt (2016): In a 5–3 decision delivered by Justice Breyer, the Court struck down restrictions the state of Texas had placed on abortion clinics as an "undue burden" on access to abortion.
Trump v. Hawaii (2018): In a 5–4 decision written by Chief Justice Roberts, the Court overturned a preliminary injunction against the Trump travel ban, allowing it to go into effect. The Court also overturned the precedent Korematsu v United States (1944), which allowed President Franklin Delano Roosevelt to intern Japanese Americans during World War II.
Carpenter v. United States (2018): In a 5–4 decision written by Chief Justice Roberts, the Court held that government acquisition of cell-site records is a Fourth Amendment search, and, thus, generally requires a warrant.
Janus v. AFSCME (2018): In a 5–4 decision, the Court ruled that public-sector labor union fees from non-union members violate the First Amendment right to free speech, overturning the 1977 decision in Abood v. Detroit Board of Education that had previously allowed such fees.
Timbs v. Indiana (2019): In a 9–0 decision, the Court ruled that the "excessive fines" clause of the Eighth Amendment is incorporated against state and local governments, affecting the use of civil forfeitures.
Rucho v. Common Cause (2019): In a 5–4 decision written by Chief Justice Roberts, the Court held that partisan gerrymandering claims present nonjusticiable political questions.
Bostock v. Clayton County (2020): In a 6–3 decision delivered by Justice Gorsuch, the Court ruled that Title VII employment protections of the Civil Rights Act of 1964 do extend to cover gender identity and sexual orientation.
Espinoza v. Montana Department of Revenue (2020): In a 5–4 decision written by Chief Justice Roberts, the Court held that a state-based scholarship program that provides public funds to allow students to attend private schools cannot discriminate against religious schools under the Free Exercise Clause of the Constitution.
Brnovich v. Democratic National Committee (2021): In a 6–3 decision written by Justice Alito, the Court held that two Arizona voting laws did not violate the 1965 Voting Rights Act nor had a racially discriminatory purpose. The ruling in effect limited Section 2 of the Voting Rights Act.
Americans for Prosperity Foundation v. Bonta (2021): In a 6–3 decision written by Chief Justice Roberts, the Court struck down a California law requiring non-profit organizations to disclose the identity of their large donors to the state, ruling that the regulation placed too much of a burden on donors and violated their First Amendment rights.
Mahanoy Area School District v. B.L. (2021): In a 8–1 decision written by Justice Breyer, the Court ruled that the school violated first amendment rights by punishing off campus speech. 
New York State Rifle & Pistol Association, Inc. v. Bruen (2022): In a 6–3 decision delivered by Justice Thomas, the Court struck down a New York law requiring applicants for a concealed carry license to show "proper cause", ruling that the regulation prevented law-abiding citizens with ordinary self-defense needs from exercising their Second Amendment rights.
Dobbs v. Jackson Women's Health Organization (2022): In a 6–3 decision, a Mississippi state law that bans most abortion operations after the first 15 weeks of pregnancy was upheld. In a more narrow 5–4 ruling, delivered by Justice Alito, the Court also overturned Roe v. Wade and Planned Parenthood v. Casey, ruling that the Constitution does not confer a right to abortion.
Kennedy v. Bremerton School District (2022): In a 6–3 decision delivered by Justice Gorsuch, the Court ruled that the government, while following the Establishment Clause, may not suppress an individual, in this case a public high school football coach, from engaging in personal religious observance, as doing so would violate the Free Speech and Free Exercise Clauses of the First Amendment. The Court overruled Lemon v. Kurtzman and in doing so overturned the 51-year-old precedent known as the "Lemon test".

Judicial philosophy

The Roberts Court has been described as extremely conservative and "dominated by an ambitious conservative wing." Alito, Thomas, Kennedy, Roberts, and Scalia generally have taken more conservative positions, while Ginsburg, Breyer, Sotomayor, and Kagan have generally taken more liberal positions. Souter and Stevens had also been part of the liberal bloc prior to their respective retirements. These two blocs of voters have lined up together in several major cases, though Justice Kennedy had often sided with the liberal bloc. Roberts has also served as a swing vote, often advocating for narrow rulings and compromise among the two blocs of justices. Though the Court sometimes does divide along partisan lines, attorney and SCOTUSblog founder Tom Goldstein has noted that more cases are decided 9–0 and that the individual justices hold a wide array of views.

The judicial philosophy of Roberts on the Supreme Court has been assessed by leading court commentators including Jeffrey Rosen and Marcia Coyle. Although Roberts is identified as having a conservative judicial philosophy, his vote in National Federation of Independent Business v. Sebelius (2012) upholding the constitutionality of the Patient Protection and Affordable Care Act (ACA) has caused reflection in the press concerning the comparative standing of his conservative judicial philosophy compared to other sitting justices of conservative orientation; he is seen as having a more moderate conservative orientation, particularly when his vote to uphold the ACA is compared to Rehnquist's vote in Bush v. Gore. Some commentators have also noted that Roberts uses his vote in high-profile cases to achieve a facially-neutral result that sets up for larger conservative rulings in the future. The Five Four Podcast went so far as to deem this maneuver the "Roberts Two-Step."

Regarding Roberts' contemporaneous peers on the bench, his judicial philosophy is seen as more moderate and conciliatory than that of Antonin Scalia and Clarence Thomas. Roberts has not indicated any particularly enhanced reading of originalism or framer's intentions as has been plainly evident in Scalia's speeches and writings. Roberts' strongest inclination on the Court has been to attempt to re-establish the centrist aesthetics of the Court as being party neutral, in contrast to his predecessor Rehnquist who had devoted significant effort to promote a 'states-rights' orientation for the Court. Roberts' voting pattern reflecting his conservative judicial philosophy is most closely aligned to Samuel Alito on the Court, the latter of whom has also become associated with libertarian trends in the conservative judicial philosophy.

After Ginsburg was replaced by Barrett, several commentators wrote that Roberts was no longer the leading justice. As the five other conservative justices could outvote the rest, he supposedly could no longer preside over a moderately conservative course while respecting precedent. Some said this view was confirmed by the court's 2022 ruling in Dobbs v. Jackson Women's Health Organization, which overturned the landmark rulings Roe v. Wade and Planned Parenthood v. Casey of 1973 and 1992, respectively. The conservative bloc is sometimes further split into a wing more hesitant to overrule precedent (Roberts, Kavanaugh, and Barrett), and a wing more willing to overrule precedent (Clarence Thomas, Samuel Alito, and Neil Gorsuch). Roberts wrote the majority opinion in West Virginia v. EPA which officially established the major questions doctrine and gutted the ability of the EPA to regulate power plant emissions using generation shifting under the Clean Air Act (United States). That opinion drew ire from critics who argued that Roberts and the conservative bloc manufactured a doctrine to thwart climate reforms.

Criticism

Democratic backsliding 

In a July 2022 research paper entitled "The Supreme Court's Role in the Degradation of U.S. Democracy," the Campaign Legal Center, founded by Republican Trevor Potter, asserted that the Roberts Court "has turned on our democracy" and was on an "anti-democratic crusade" that had "accelerated and become increasingly
extreme with the arrival" of Trump's three appointees.

List of Roberts Court opinions

Supreme Court opinions during the 2005 term
Supreme Court opinions during the 2006 term
Supreme Court opinions during the 2007 term
Supreme Court opinions during the 2008 term
Supreme Court opinions during the 2009 term
Supreme Court opinions during the 2010 term
Supreme Court opinions during the 2011 term
Supreme Court opinions during the 2012 term
Supreme Court opinions during the 2013 term
Supreme Court opinions during the 2014 term
Supreme Court opinions during the 2015 term
Supreme Court opinions during the 2016 term
Supreme Court opinions during the 2017 term
Supreme Court opinions during the 2018 term
Supreme Court opinions during the 2019 term
Supreme Court opinions during the 2020 term
Supreme Court opinions during the 2021 term
Supreme Court opinions during the 2022 term

Gallery

References

Further reading

 Boyer, Cynthia. "The Supreme Court and Politics in the Trump Era." Elon L. Rev. 12 (2020): 215. online
 Chemerinsky, Erwin. "Roberts Court at Age Three, The." Wayne L. Rev. 54 (2008): 947.
 Collins, Ronald KL. "Foreword, Exceptional Freedom—The Roberts Court, the First Amendment, and the New Absolutism." Albany Law Review 76.1 (2013): 409–66. online 
 Cross, Frank B., and James W. Pennebaker. "The language of the Roberts court." Michigan State St. L. Rev. (2014): 853. online
 Eidelson, Benjamin. "Reasoned Explanation and Political Accountability in the Roberts Court." Yale LJ 130 (2020): 1748. online
 Franklin, David L. "What kind of business-friendly court? Explaining the Chamber of Commerce's success at the Roberts Court." Santa Clara Law Review 49 (2009). online
 Gottlieb, Stephen E. Unfit for Democracy: The Roberts Court and the Breakdown of American Politics (New York University Press, 2016. xii, 381 pp
 Halbrook, Stephen P. "Taking Heller Seriously: Where Has the Roberts Court Been, and Where Is It Headed, on the Second Amendment." Charleston L. Rev. 13 (2018): 175. online
 Liptak, Adam. "Court under Roberts is most conservative in decades." Sup. Ct. Preview (2012): 48. online 
 Mayeux, Sara. "Youth and Punishment at the Roberts Court." U. Pa. J. Const. L. 21 (2018): 543. online
 Mazie, Steven V. American Justice 2015: The Dramatic Tenth Term of the Roberts Court. (University of Pennsylvania Press, 2015).
 Metzger, Gillian E. "The Roberts Court and Administrative Law." The Supreme Court Review 2019.1 (2020): 1–71. online
 Tribe, Laurence, and Joshua Matz. Uncertain Justice: The Roberts Court and the Constitution (Henry Holt, 2014).
 Tushnet, Mark. In the Balance: Law and Politics on the Roberts Court (WW Norton, 2013). 324pp
 Waltman, Jerold. Church and State in the Roberts Court: Christian Conservatism and Social Change in Ten Cases, 2005–2018 (McFarland, 2019).

2000s in the United States
2005 establishments in the United States
United States Supreme Court history by court